Shirley J. Winsley (born June 9, 1934) is an American politician who served in the Washington House of Representatives from the 28th district from 1974 to 1975, from 1977 to 1983, and from 1985 to 1993, and in the Washington State Senate, representing the 28th district from 1993 to 2004.

References

External links

1934 births
Living people
Members of the Washington House of Representatives
Pierce County Councillors
Washington (state) state senators
Washington (state) Democrats
Washington (state) Republicans
Women state legislators in Washington (state)